Pocky & Rocky, known in Japan as , is a scrolling shooter video game series originating with the 1986 arcade game Kiki Kaikai by Taito. The game was adapted into a series of home console games mainly developed and published by Natsume which were titled Pocky & Rocky in the West. The games follow the adventures of a young Shinto shrine maiden, Pocky, and her tanuki companion, Rocky, as they fight against monsters from Japanese mythology.

Overview

Common elements 
The Pocky & Rocky games are scrolling shooter games. They star Pocky, a young Shinto shrine maiden, and her tanuki companion Rocky as they fight a variety of monsters. The games pull heavily from Japanese mythology, featuring many Japanese legendary creatures. Pocky is typically equipped with ofuda and gohei, which she uses to battle enemies and progress through the environments.

History 
The first game in the series, Kiki Kaikai, was developed and published by Taito in Japanese arcades in 1986. Home ports were also released in Japan for the MSX2, Famicom Disk System, and PC Engine. The game would remain exclusive to Japan until a 2003 mobile port. Ports of the game have also since been released worldwide in various Taito arcade compilations, as well as through Arcade Archives.

Taito licensed the brand to Natsume in the early 1990s, who developed two new games in the series for the Super Nintendo. Natsume retitled the game for an international release, giving them the names Pocky & Rocky (1992) and Pocky & Rocky 2 (1994). Altron developed and published Pocky & Rocky with Becky for the Game Boy Advance in 2001.

Japanese developer Starfish SD was developing a Pocky & Rocky game for the PlayStation 2, tentatively titled Kiki Kaikai 2, but it was cancelled in 2007 after Taito pulled the series licensing. A representative of Starfish SD explained that Taito "had some issues with us and we had to let the title go." The company reworked their assets into an original game, originally titled Kiki Kai World. The game was finally released as Heavenly Guardian in North America and Legend of Sayuki in Europe. It was released for the Wii in 2007 and PlayStation 2 in 2008.

A Windows port will be released in February 2023. The game was developed by Tengo Project, which previously developed Wild Guns Reloaded (2016) and The Ninja Saviors: Return of the Warriors (2019). The team consisted of people who had worked on the first Pocky & Rocky game by Natsume for the Super NES. After being defeated at the end of Pocky & Rocky, Black Mantle travels back in time to get revenge. The game features a mix of revamped stages from Pocky & Rocky with original stages. As of July 2022, the game had sold over 100,000 copies.

Games

References 

Pocky & Rocky
Nintendo Switch games
Square Enix franchises
Video game franchises introduced in 1986